Alien Blood is a 1917 silent film drama directed by Burton George and starring Winifred Greenwood. It is taken from a short story, The Alien Blood, by Louise Rice.

The film is preserved at the Library of Congress.

Cast
 Clifford Grey - 
Winifred Greenwood -

References

External links

 listing; allmovie.com

1917 films
Films based on short fiction
American silent feature films
1917 drama films
American black-and-white films
Silent American drama films
Surviving American silent films
Films directed by Burton George
1910s American films